Ivasyuk (alternative spelling Ivasiuk), a family name of Ukrainian origin. It is derived from Ivas or Ivasyk ( or ), the diminutive form of the Ukrainian name Ivan, "John", and the suffix -yuk, denoting descent, especially in the Ukrainian Carpathian mountains area.

The surname may refer to:

 Vasyl Ivasyuk (born 1960), Ukrainian Greek Catholic hierarch.
 Veronika Ivasiuk (born 1995), Ukrainian female weightlifter
 Volodymyr Ivasyuk (1949–1979), Ukrainian songwriter (Chervona Ruta), composer and poet.

See also
 
 Ivashko

Ukrainian-language surnames
Patronymic surnames
Surnames of Ukrainian origin